Langhorne station is a station along the SEPTA West Trenton Line to Ewing, New Jersey, United States. It is located at Bellevue (PA 413) & Comly Avenues in Langhorne Manor, Pennsylvania.

The station has off-street parking, a ticket office, and bicycle racks.  In FY 2013, Langhorne station had a weekday average of 643 boardings and 688 alightings.

Langhorne station was originally built by the Reading Railroad in 1881.  On May 29, 2009, SEPTA announced a $2.3 million plan to replace the existing station. On April 6, 2010, the original station was demolished in order to make room for its replacement.

It is near the borough limits of Penndel.

Station layout
Langhorne consists of a single low-level side platform adjacent to the inbound track. Access to the outbound track is via concrete crossovers of the inbound track.

Gallery

Bibliography

References

External links

SEPTA – Langhorne Station
 Station from Bellevue Avenue from Google Maps Street View

SEPTA Regional Rail stations
Former Reading Company stations
Railway stations in the United States opened in 1876
1876 establishments in Pennsylvania
Railway stations in Bucks County, Pennsylvania